Tesa Vilar (born 3 September 1995) is a former Slovenian professional racing cyclist. She rode for the BTC City Ljubljana team in the 2015 cycling season.

See also
 List of 2015 UCI Women's Teams and riders

References

External links
 

1995 births
Living people
Slovenian female cyclists
Place of birth missing (living people)